A footman is a servant.

Footman may also refer to:

Infantry ("foot soldier")
Footman (furniture), British term for a metal stand for keeping plates and dishes hot
Dan Footman (born 1969), American football player
Philip Williams (MP) alias Footman (c.1519–c.1558), English politician
Tim Footman (born 1968), British author, journalist and editor
Moths of the subfamily Arctiinae